Ingwe may refer to:

 Ingwe, Zambia, part of the Kasempa constituency, in North-Western Province, Zambia
 Ingwe Local Municipality, KwaZulu-Natal, South Africa
 ZT3 Ingwe, a South African anti-tank guided missile
 Ingwe Coal Corporation; see Mick Davis
 The nickname for Kenyan Premier League club A.F.C. Leopards
 Ingwë, an elf in J. R. R. Tolkien's legendarium
 Ingwe, a piece for electric guitar by Georges Lentz